William Henry Hoyle (August 28, 1842 – October 27, 1918) was an English-born furniture maker and politician in Ontario, Canada. He was speaker of the Legislative Assembly of Ontario from 1912 to 1914 and served as Conservative MLA for Ontario North from 1898 to 1918.

He was born in Barnstaple, Devonshire, was educated there and emigrated to Canada soon afterwards. Hoyle settled in Cannington, Ontario, where he worked as a cabinet maker and upholsterer. Hoyle served on the Cannington School Board, also serving as secretary treasurer. In 1895, he became reeve of Cannington. He helped found All Saint's Anglican Church and served as Grand Master of the Orange Order in Ontario (1898) and Grand Master of the local International Order of Oddfellows. Hoyle died in office in 1918.

References

External links

Speakers of the Legislative Assembly of Ontario
Progressive Conservative Party of Ontario MPPs
1842 births
1918 deaths
People from Brock, Ontario